The 1950 Arizona Wildcats football team represented the University of Arizona in the Border Conference during the 1950 college football season.  In their second season under head coach Bob Winslow, the Wildcats compiled a 4–6 record (2–4 against Border opponents) and were outscored by their opponents, 257 to 214. The team captain was Eddie Wolgast.  The team played its home games in Arizona Stadium in Tucson, Arizona.

Schedule

References

Arizona
Arizona Wildcats football seasons
Arizona Wildcats football